|}

This is a list of electoral district results for the 1915 Queensland state election.

At the time, the voting system in Queensland was based on contingency voting, which was similar to the modern optional preferential voting system. In electorates with 3 or more candidates, preferences were not distributed if a candidate received more than 50% of the primary vote.

If none received more than 50%, all except the top two candidates were eliminated from the count and their preferences distributed between the two leaders, with the one receiving the most votes declared the winner.

Results by electoral district

Albert

Aubigny

Balonne

Barcoo

Bowen

Bremer

Brisbane

Bulimba

Bundaberg

Buranda

Burke

Burnett

Burrum

Cairns

Carnarvon

Charters Towers

Chillagoe

Cook

Cooroora

Cunningham

Dalby

Drayton

Eacham

East Toowoomba

Enoggera

Fassifern

Fitzroy

Flinders

Fortitude Valley

By-election 

 This by-election was caused by the death of David Bowman and was held on 1 April 1916.

Gregory

By-election 

 This by-election was caused by the appointment of William Hamilton to the Legislative Council and was held on 4 September 1915.

Gympie

Herbert

Ipswich

Ithaca

Kennedy

Keppel

Kurilpa

Leichhardt

Lockyer

Logan

Mackay

Maranoa

Maree

Maryborough

By-election 

 This by-election was caused by the appointment of Alfred Jones to the Legislative Council, and was held on 31 March 1917.

Merthyr

Mirani

Mitchell

Mount Morgan

Mundingburra

Murilla

Murrumba

Musgrave

Nanango

Normanby

Nundah

Oxley

Paddington

Pittsworth

Port Curtis

Queenton

Rockhampton

By-elections 

 This by-election was caused by the resignation of John Adamson. It was held on 12 May 1917.

Rosewood

South Brisbane

Stanley

Toombul

Toowong

Toowoomba

Townsville

Warrego

Warwick

Wide Bay

Windsor

See also 

 1915 Queensland state election
 Candidates of the Queensland state election, 1915
 Members of the Queensland Legislative Assembly, 1915-1918

References 

Results of Queensland elections